Yungblud is the third studio album by English musician Yungblud, released on 2 September 2022 by Locomotion and Geffen Records. The lead single for the album, "The Funeral", was released on 11 March 2022, followed by the second single, "Memories" with Willow, on 6 May 2022. 
Yungblud was announced on 17 May 2022, via an online livestream in which Yungblud received a ribcage tattoo.

Commercial performance
Yungblud debuted at number 1 on the UK Albums Chart with 22,825 units, becoming his second number one album in the country. In the US, the album debuted at number 45 on the Billboard 200 chart with 13,000 album-equivalent units.

Track listing
All tracks are produced by Chris Greatti and Yungblud, except where noted.

Note
  indicates a co-producer
  indicates an additional producer
 "Fleabag" is stylized in lowercase

Personnel
Musicians
 Yungblud – vocals (all tracks), acoustic guitar (2, 3, 8, 10, 12, 13, 16), electric guitar (2, 10), keyboards (3, 12, 16), Wurlitzer electronic piano (7); bass guitar, drums, programming (16)
 Chris Greatti – bass guitar, electric guitar (all tracks); drums, programming (1); drum programming (3–12), synthesizer (3, 6, 8, 11), acoustic guitar (4–6, 9–11), Mellotron (5, 6, 8), background vocals (8, 10)
 Jake Torrey – bass guitar, drums, electric guitar (2); cymbals (4)
 Paul Meany – drum programming, synthesizer (2)
 Matt Schwartz – synthesizer (2, 10), electric guitar (10)
 Dylan Brady – drum programming (3)
 Willow – vocals (3)
 Omer Fedi – electric guitar (5)
 Nick Mira – percussion (5)
 Jordan Gable – background vocals (10)
 Tom Pallant – background vocals (10)
 Ed Juniper – drums (10)
 Adam Warrington – acoustic guitar (13), electric guitar (14)
 Ben Sharp – drums (14)
 Andrew Wells – bass guitar, drums, guitar, keyboards, percussion, programming (15)

Technical
 Randy Merrill – mastering
 Mike Crossey – mixing (1, 7, 11, 12, 15), engineering (1)
 Mitch McCarthy – mixing, engineering (2, 3, 5, 9, 13)
 Geoff Swan – mixing, engineering (4, 6)
 Mark "Spike" Stent – mixing, engineering (7)
 Lars Stalfors – mixing, engineering (10)
 Owen Charles – mixing, engineering (14)
 Clem Cherry – mixing (16)
 Robin Schmidt – engineering (1)
 Stephen Sesso – additional engineering (1, 8, 12, 13), mixing assistance (8, 12)
 Matt Cahill – additional engineering, mixing assistance (4, 6)
 Niko Battistini – additional engineering, mixing assistance (4, 6)
 Matthew Neighbor – additional engineering, mixing assistance (10)
 Matt Schwartz – co-mixing (16)

Charts

References

2022 albums
Albums produced by Dylan Brady
Geffen Records albums
Yungblud albums